Belarus participated in the Junior Eurovision Song Contest 2018 which took place in Minsk, Belarus on 25 November 2018. The Belarusian entry for the 2018 contest was selected through a national final organised by the Belarusian broadcaster National State Television and Radio Company of the Republic of Belarus. It saw ten competing acts participating in a televised production where the winner was determined by a 50/50 combination of votes from a jury made up of music professionals and a public vote.

Background

The country previously hosted the  contest in Minsk and will host for a second year in 2018. In 2017, Helena Meraai represented Belarus in Tbilisi, Georgia with the song "I Am the One". It ended in 5th place with 149 points.

Before Junior Eurovision

National final
The national final took place on 31 August 2018 at the "600 Metrov" studio in Minsk. It was mainly hosted by Olga Ryzhikova and 2014 Belarusian Eurovision contestant Teo, while Helena Meraai and Ruslan Aslanov were hosts in the green room. Ten competing acts participated in a televised production where the winner was determined by a 50/50 combination of both telephone vote and the votes of a jury made up of music professionals. 

The members of the jury were Nataliya Tamelo, Tatyana Parhamovitch, Olga Salamakha, Evgeny Perlin, Aleks David, Igor Melnikov and Olga Vronskaya.

Artist and song information

Daniel Yastremski
Daniel Aleks Yastremski (born 12 February 2004 in Cincinnati) is an American-born Belarusian singer. He represented Belarus at the Junior Eurovision Song Contest 2018 with the song "Time", finishing eleventh.

Daniel Yastremski was born in Cincinnati, Ohio, USA on 12 February 2004. He moved to Minsk as a small child and has been taking part in music lessons since he was six years old. Since then he has taken part in numerous competitions and represented Belarus at New Wave Junior in 2017.

Time
"Time" is a song by Belarusian singer Daniel Yastremski. It represented Belarus at the Junior Eurovision Song Contest 2018. The song placed 11th with 114 points.

At Junior Eurovision
During the opening ceremony and the running order draw which both took place on 19 November 2018, Belarus was drawn to perform eighth on 25 November 2018, following Azerbaijan and preceding Ireland.

Voting

Detailed voting results

References

Junior Eurovision Song Contest
Belarus
2018